These are the results of the women's team all-around competition, one of six events for female competitors in artistic gymnastics at the 2000 Summer Olympics in Sydney. The qualification and final rounds took place on September 17 and 19 at the Sydney SuperDome. The number of gymnasts that made up each national team had changed again from 7 in the 1996 Summer Olympics in Atlanta and back to 6, the number from the 1992 Summer Olympics in Barcelona. The format was similar to that of 1996, but specific to Sydney, 5 out of 6 gymnasts would compete on each apparatus where only the top 4 scores would count towards the final combined score at the end.

After questions were raised about several athletes' ages at the 2008 Olympics, the International Gymnastics Federation also opened an investigation into two athletes from these games.

In February 2010, FIG ruled that Dong Fangxiao was only 14 during the Sydney Olympics, two years younger than the minimum age requirement for Olympic competition. Her results from the 1999 World Championships and 2000 Olympics were deleted from the records, and the FIG recommended that the IOC disqualify the Chinese all-around team and strip them of the bronze medal. The IOC agreed with the recommendation, and reallocated the bronze medals on April 28, 2010. On August 11, 2010, the reallocated medals were awarded to the fourth-placed United States team at a formal awards ceremony during the United States National Championships at the XL Center.

Results

Qualification

Twelve national teams composed by six gymnasts competed in the team all-around event in the artistic gymnastics qualification round on September 17.
The six highest scoring teams advanced to the final on September 19.

Final

References

Additional sources
Official Olympic Report
www.gymnasticsresults.com

Women's artistic team all-around
2000
Olympics
2000 in women's gymnastics
Women's events at the 2000 Summer Olympics